The 1990 Maylands state by-election was a by-election for the seat of Maylands in the Legislative Assembly of Western Australia held on 26 May 1990. It was triggered by the resignation of Peter Dowding (the sitting Labor member and former premier) on 26 April 1990. The Labor Party retained Maylands at the election, albeit with a reduced majority. Judy Edwards, a general practitioner based in Mount Lawley, secured 55.57 percent of the two-party-preferred vote. Edwards became only the second woman to win election to the Parliament of Western Australia at a by-election, after May Holman in 1925. The election occurred on the same day as the 1990 Fremantle state by-election.

Background
Peter Dowding had held Maylands for the Labor Party since the 1986 state election, when he transferred from the Legislative Council to the Legislative Assembly. He replaced Brian Burke as leader of the Labor Party (and thus as premier) in February 1988, and led the party to victory at the 1989 election. However, Dowding was forced to resign as premier in February 1990 after losing the confidence of the Labor partyroom, having been caught up in the WA Inc. scandal. He quit parliament a few months later, on 26 April. The writ for the by-election was issued on the same day, with the close of nominations on 4 May. Polling day was on 26 May, with the writ returned on 6 June.

Results

Aftermath
Edwards retained Maylands until her retirement at the 2008 state election, and served as a minister in the government of Geoff Gallop.

See also
 List of Western Australian state by-elections
 Women in the Western Australian Legislative Assembly

References

Western Australian state by-elections
1990 elections in Australia
1990s in Perth, Western Australia